UNAM School of Medicine may refer to:
UNAM School of Medicine (Namibia)
 School of Medicine, UNAM, Mexico